The West Moreton colonial by-election, May 1861 was a by-election held on 31 May 1861 in the electoral district of West Moreton for the Queensland Legislative Assembly.

History
On 16 May 1861, Henry Challinor, the member for West Moreton, resigned. He was re-elected at the resulting by-election on 31 May 1861.

See also
 Members of the Queensland Legislative Assembly, 1860–1863

References

1861 elections in Australia
Queensland state by-elections
1860s in Queensland
May 1861 events